VeriWave is a company in Beaverton, Oregon, U.S.  It was founded in 2002 to design and manufacture specialized testing equipment for Wi-Fi and Ethernet—products primarily of interest to manufacturers of wireless access points and network infrastructure.

VeriWave is a privately held company with investors including US Venture Partners and TL Ventures.  Primary customers include Cisco and Aruba Networks.

EE Times mentioned VeriWave for MIMO (multiple antennas to improve transmission) testing as well as packet loss analysis in 802.11 networks.

On July 18, 2011, Ixia announced acquisition of VeriWave as an integral component of its strategy to become a single-source solution for testing converged multiplay IP services and media-rich traffic over wireless and wireline networks.

See also
 WLAN

References

External links
 Corporate site for lab tools
 Corporate site for field tools

Electronics companies of the United States
Companies based in Beaverton, Oregon
Companies established in 2002
Privately held companies based in Oregon
2002 establishments in Oregon